The Stu Sells Port Elgin Superspiel is a bonspiel part of the men's Ontario Curling Tour. The event was previously held in January but was moved to November and became part of the OCT beginning in 2012. The event takes place at the Port Elgin Curling Club in Port Elgin, Ontario.

Past Champions

References

External links
Official site

Ontario Curling Tour events
Bruce County